The Hamond, later Hamond-Graeme Baronetcy, of Holly Grove in the County of Berkshire, was a title in the Baronetage of Great Britain. It was created on 18 December 1783 for  the Royal Navy officer Andrew Hamond. His son, the second Baronet, was an Admiral of the Fleet. The third Baronet assumed the additional surname of Graeme in 1873. The title became extinct in 1969 on the death of the fifth Baronet.

Hamond, later Hamond-Graeme baronets, of Hilly Grove (1783) 
Sir Andrew Snape Hamond, 1st Baronet (1738–1828)
Sir Graham Eden Hamond, 2nd Baronet (1799–1862)
Sir Andrew Snape Hamond-Graeme, 3rd Baronet (1811–1874)
Sir Graham Eden William Graeme Hamond-Graeme, 4th Baronet (1845–1920)
Sir Egerton Hood Murray Hamond-Graeme, 5th Baronet (1877–1969), who left no heir.

References 

Extinct baronetcies in the Baronetage of Great Britain